White line(s) may refer to:

Arts and entertainment 
 The White Line (1950 film), an Italian drama film by Luigi Zampa
 The White Line (2019 film), a Namibian drama romantic history film
 White Line (album), by Memorain, 2003 
 "White Line", a song by Neil Young and Crazy Horse from the 1990 album Ragged Glory
 "White Lines (Don't Don't Do It)", a 1983 song by Melle Mel
 "White Lines" (Rick Ross song), a 2019 song from the album Port of Miami 2
 White Lines (TV series), a 2020 British-Spanish mystery thriller streaming on Netflix

Transportation 
 White Line (Long Island Rail Road), a 19th-century line in Queens County, New York, U.S.
 White Line (Montreal Metro), an unbuilt line in Montreal, Canada
 White Line (New Jersey Transit)
 Whitelining or lane splitting, riding between lines of traffic

Other uses 
 White Line Hotels, a hospitality group
 White line, the Vatican-Italy border, painted for Hugh O'Flaherty
 White line, part of a horse hoof
 White line disease, a fungal infection of the horse's hoof
 Hilton white line or anocutaneous line, a boundary in the anal canal

See also

 Silver Line (disambiguation)
White line fever (disambiguation)
 White Diamond Line
 White Star Line, a British shipping company